Dr. Thumbay Moideen (born March 23, 1957) is an Indian businessman based in Dubai, United Arab Emirates. He is the founder and president of the Thumbay Group, a diversified international business conglomerate headquartered in the Dubai International Financial Centre, with operations across 20 sectors.

Early years
Dr. Moideen was born on 23 March 1957 in Mangalore, India to Ahamed Hajee Mohiudeen and his wife Bee Fathima Ahmed Hajee. A third generation entrepreneur from a well-known business family from Mangalore, at age of 21 years Dr. Moideen took over the reins of the business house established by his father.

Career
Dr. Moideen brought the family business to the  Persian Gulf with the launch of the Thumbay Group, UAE (United Arab Emirates) in 1998. He was the first expatriate to be invited by the rulers of Ajman to start a medical institution in the UAE. Thus, the Gulf Medical University was established, which ultimately became a destination for medical education for students from over 80 countries.

Starting with the establishment of Thumbay Group in 1998, he has set up business operations in 20 sectors. Today, the Group has developed into a business conglomerate with diversified interests in Education, Healthcare, Medical Research, Diagnostics, Retail Pharmacy, Health Communications, Retail Optical, Wellness, Nutrition Stores, Hospitality, Real Estate, Publishing, Technology, Media, Events, Medical Tourism, Trading and Marketing & Distribution. The organisation employs close to 5,000 employees in the UAE. In 2016, he has been ranked 16 among "The Top Indian Business Leaders in The Arab World" by Forbes Middle East.

Organisation and Community Leadership
Dr. Moideen is the Chief Patron of the Ajman Indian Association, Indian Business Council – Ajman, Beary’s Association – Dubai, and Karnataka Sangha – Sharjah. He is also the president of the Asian Hospital Federation – UAE region, member of the International Hospital Federation, Ferney Voltaire, France (Greater Geneva Area), and member of the International Association of University Presidents.

Conferral of Honorary Doctorate 

He was conferred an Honorary Doctorate at the annual convocation ceremony of Amity University – Dubai, on 20 November 2017. An official statement by Amity University Dubai said that Mr. Thumbay Moideen was being conferred the honor in view of his “significant contributions towards promotion of medical education, trade and industry, and social and economic development of the nation.”

Other awards and recognition
Dr. Thumbay Moideen has been ranked 59 in the prestigious ‘Barclays HurunIndia Rich List 2018’. In 2017, Thumbay Moideen was ranked 12 among "The Top Indian Business Leaders in The Arab World" by Forbes Middle East. Dr. Moideen has been featured in various lists such as "Top Indian Leaders in the Arab World” by Forbes Middle East Magazine – for four consecutive years from 2014 to 2017, Arabian Business 50 Richest Indians in the GCC by Arabian Business Magazine, published by ITP Publishing Group – for four consecutive years in 2013, 2014, 2015 and 2016 Forbes Middle East’s Top 100 Indian Leaders in the UAE" and Top 100 [Companies] making an impact in the Arab World,  Top 100 most influential Indians in the Middle East for three consecutive years in 2010, 2011, 2012 as well as in 2014 by Arabian Business Magazine. He received ‘The Eminent Aloysian Alumni Award 2016’, jointly organized by his alma mater St. Aloysius College – Mangaluru and the St. Aloysius College Alumni Association (SACAA), in 2016. He was featured on the cover of the February 2016 issue of Forbes Middle East. A Special Report of Gulf News Focus featured him among the influential Indians in the UAE. He was also featured in the cover story of International Indian Magazine’s April 2011 issue, in addition to being honored at the House of Lords, UK for invaluable contributions in the fields of Healthcare and Medical Education.

He has received several awards such as the ‘Global Leader’ award at NDTV Gulf Indian Excellence Awards 2016, Indian Innovator Award, Entrepreneur of the Year 2015, 4th Asian Leadership Award (2014), award for outstanding contribution to Education at World Chancellor Congress in Mumbai, India (2014), Emirates Business Ambassador Award 2014, NGI Excellence Award 2012 at the Global Indian Business Meet (GIBM) New York, CEO of the Year – Education Award 2012 by the ITP Publishing Group UAE, Mayura Award for achievements in the field of medical education and healthcare by Karnataka Sangha Sharjah, Achievement in the field of Medical Education and Healthcare awarded by Sheikh Humaid Bin Rashid Al Nuaimi, Member of Supreme Council and Ruler of Ajman – UAE, Honorary Fellowship of International Medical Sciences Academy (IMSA),

Conferences Spoken at
Dr. Moideen has been a speaker at various conferences and seminars held in America, Europe, Middle East and the Indian subcontinent, in prestigious programs like the Emirates NBD Global Business Series - Dubai, the 1st International Conference on 'Cooperation in Higher Education within the EURAS' held under the auspices of the Eurasian Universities Union (EURAS) - Istanbul, the Vibrant Business Summit - Gandhinagar, the 7th Annual Higher Education Summit Asia – Singapore, World Bank – Washington, the International Association of Universities President (IAUP) - Tokyo, etc.  He led the panel discussion on the topic “Time to Bridge the Gulf,” conducted in Dubai as part of the NDTV Gulf Indian Excellence Awards 2016.  He was also the keynote speaker at the Leadership & Entrepreneurship Series held at Sharjah Chamber of Commerce and Industry (SCCI) on  the 6th of March, 2017, and at the 37th Annual IMASA Convention held at Coastlands Umhlanga Hotel and Convention Centre, Durban, South Africa on 29th & 30 April 2017.

Thumbay Foundation 
Thumbay Foundation is a charitable trust which supports charitable activities in healthcare & education through scholarships, grants, bursaries, awards, fellowships, endowments, donations and other forms of financial assistance to students pursuing any level of education or training in any educational or training institutions or establishments or otherwise in such manner as may be decided by the Foundation.

Family 
Dr. Thumbay Moideen is married to Zohra and they have two sons, Akbar Moideen Thumbay and Akram Moideen Thumbay. Akbar manages Thumbay Group’s hospitals as the Vice President of the healthcare division, while Akram manages the construction & renovation division as its Director-Operations and also serves as the Director of Thumbay Technologies. Akbar is married to Nousheen Salma, who is in charge of handling the editorial and design advice of ‘Health’ magazine, Thumbay Group’s health and lifestyle publication. Akbar and Nousheen have three sons - Ahmed, Omar and Rashid.

References

Indian philanthropists
Mangaloreans
Living people
Indian Muslims
Businesspeople from Mangalore
Indian expatriates in the United Arab Emirates
1957 births